I'm a Lonesome Fugitive is the third studio album by Merle Haggard and The Strangers released on Capitol Records in 1967.

Recording and composition
The song "I'm a Lonesome Fugitive" brought Haggard country stardom. Although it sounds autobiographical (Haggard had done time at San Quentin), David Cantwell states in his book The Running Kind that it was actually written by Liz Anderson and her husband Casey while driving cross country and was inspired by the popular television show The Fugitive starring David Jansen as Richard Kimble. Haggard felt a connection to the song immediately and when it was released it became his first number one country hit. When Anderson played the song for Haggard, she was unaware about his prison stretch. "I guess I didn't realize how much the experience at San Quentin did to him, 'cause he never talked about it all that much," Bonnie Owens, Haggard's backup singer, and then-wife, is quoted in the liner notes to the 1994 retrospective, Down Every Road. "I could tell he was in a dark mood...and I said, 'Is everything okay?'  And he said, 'I'm really scared.' And I said, 'Why?' And he said, 'Cause I'm afraid someday I'm gonna be out there...and there's gonna be some convict...some prisoner that was in there the same time I was in, stand up—and they're gonna be about the third row down—and say, 'What do you think you're doing, 45200?'" Haggard would address the issue on his next album, Branded Man.

In 1996, I'm a Lonesome Fugitive was reissued by BGO Records along with Mama Tried.

Reception

I'm a Lonesome Fugitive was released on March 4, 1967 and rose to number 3 on the Billboard country albums chart and made it to number 165 on the pop charts. As with his previous album Swinging Doors, Haggard wrote nearly all the songs himself. As David Cantwell observed in 2013, most of the songs find Haggard in some sort of trap, citing the prison song "Life in Prison" and "House of Memories" ("My house is a prison...") and describes the album as "hurtling and out of control even when standing still. Merle can do nothing but sit and wait for phone calls that never come...It's a fantastic album, start to end..." George Bedard of AllMusic praises Haggard's cover of the Jimmie Rodgers classic "Rough and Rowdy Ways," insisting that Haggard "could evoke the Ghosts of Country Past in an absolutely convincing way without nostalgia or imitation."

Track listing
All songs by Merle Haggard unless otherwise noted.
"I'm a Lonesome Fugitive" (Liz Anderson, Casey Anderson) - 2:56 
"All of Me Belongs to You" - 2:40 
"House of Memories" - 2:47 
"Life in Prison" (Jelly Sanders, Haggard) - 3:02
"Whatever Happened to Me" - 2:57 
"Drink Up and Be Somebody" - 2:30 
"Someone Told My Story" - 2:32 
"If You Want to Be My Woman" - 2:16 
"Mary's Mine" (Jerry Ward) - 2:56
"Skid Row" – 1:57 
"My Rough and Rowdy Ways" (Jimmie Rodgers) - 2:23
"Mixed Up Mess of a Heart" (Tommy Collins, Haggard) - 2:06

Personnel
Merle Haggard – vocals, guitar

The Strangers:
Roy Nichols – guitar
Ralph Mooney – steel guitar
George French – piano
Jerry Ward – bass
Eddie Burris – drums

with
Lewis Talley – guitar
Billy Mize – guitar
Bonnie Owens – harmony vocals

and
James Burton – guitar, dobro
Glen Campbell – guitar
Glen D. Hardin – piano
Jim Gordon – drums

Chart positions

References

External links
Capitol finally gets around to issuing 10 full-lengths from country legend Merle Haggard's 1965-71 peak era. Pitchfork Media

1967 albums
Merle Haggard albums
Capitol Records albums
Albums produced by Ken Nelson (United States record producer)

Albums recorded at Capitol Studios